Mark Bergin (born 28 April 1989) is an Irish hurler who is currently captain of the Kilkenny senior team.

Bergin made his first appearance for the team during the 2012 National League, however, he remained as a peripheral figure outside of the starting fifteen. In spite of this he won a National League medal in his debut season.

At club level Bergin is a Leinster medalist with O'Loughlin Gaels. In addition to this he has also won a county club championship medal.

In January 2017, Bergin was nominated as the captain of the Kilkenny hurling team for 2017.

References

 

1989 births
Living people
O'Loughlin Gaels hurlers
Kilkenny inter-county hurlers